John Adam was an English politician who was MP for New Romney in 1410, February 1413, March 1416, 1419, 1423, 1427, 1429, and 1431, and jurat and bailiff for the aforementioned town on many occasions. He was the Cinque Ports’ bailiff at Yarmouth from September to November 1410 and in 1430. History of Parliament Online theorizes that he was a son of Stephen Adam.

References

Members of Parliament for New Romney
15th-century English politicians
Bailiffs
Jurats
English MPs 1410
English MPs February 1413
English MPs March 1416
English MPs 1419
English MPs 1423
English MPs 1427
English MPs 1429
English MPs 1431